The 1999 O'Byrne Cup was a Gaelic football competition played by the county teams of Leinster GAA.

The tournament was a straight knockout, with 10 teams. Kildare (who took a team holiday instead) and Kilkenny did not compete.

Dublin were the winners, defeating Louth in the final in Parnell Park, a victory overshadowed by the death of one of the umpires, John Buckley, shortly after the game.

Results

References

O'Byrne Cup
O'Byrne Cup